Side Gallery is a photography gallery in Newcastle upon Tyne, run by Amber Film & Photography Collective. It opened in 1977 as Side Gallery and Cinema with a remit to show humanist photography "both by and commissioned by the group along with work it found inspirational". It is the only venue in the UK dedicated to documentary photography. Side Gallery is located at Amber's base in Side, a street in Quayside, Newcastle near the Tyne Bridge.

History
Chris Killip was a co-founder and director (1977–1979) of Side Gallery.

In 1978, Henri Cartier-Bresson had a retrospective exhibition at Side.

In 2015 it closed for a year and a half for major redevelopment, reopening in September 2016. A second exhibition space was added, as well as a library, and study centre / social space with digital access to the collection.

Collection
The gallery's collection includes "an extensive documentary record of the region" as well as work by Sirkka-Liisa Konttinen, Russell Lee, Lewis Hine, and Susan Meiselas. Some of the gallery's exhibitions that are held in its collection include Tish Murtha's Juvenile Jazz Bands (1979), Konttinen's Step by Step (1984), Dean Chapman's Shifting Ground (2001) and Karen Robinson's All Dressed Up (2005).

References

External links

1977 establishments in England
Art galleries established in 1977
Art museums and galleries in Tyne and Wear
Tourist attractions in Newcastle upon Tyne
Photography museums and galleries in England